Sir William Earle Welby-Gregory, 4th Baronet  (4 January 1829 – 26 November 1898) was a British Conservative Party politician.

Career
He was elected as a Member of Parliament (MP) for Grantham at the 1857 general election, and held the seat until he resigned on 14 April 1868 (by taking the post of Steward of the Chiltern Hundreds) in order to contest a by-election for South Lincolnshire. He was elected unopposed South Lincolnshire on 29 April, and held the seat until he resigned again on 20 February 1884, this time by becoming Steward of the Manor of Northstead.

Personal life
In 1863, William married Victoria Stuart-Wortley, by who he had three children. He died on 26 November 1898.

See also
 Welby baronets

References

External links 

1829 births
1898 deaths
Baronets in the Baronetage of the United Kingdom
Conservative Party (UK) MPs for English constituencies
Deputy Lieutenants of Lincolnshire
UK MPs 1857–1859
UK MPs 1859–1865
UK MPs 1865–1868
UK MPs 1868–1874
UK MPs 1874–1880
UK MPs 1880–1885
Members of Kesteven County Council